Knowledge compilation is a family of approaches for addressing the intractability of
a number of artificial intelligence problems.

A propositional model is compiled in an off-line phase in order to support some queries in polytime. Many ways of compiling a propositional models exist.

Different compiled representations have different properties.
The three main properties are:
 The compactness of the representation
 The queries that are supported in polytime
 The transformations of the representations that can be performed in polytime

Classes of representations 

Some examples of diagram classes include OBDDs, FBDDs, and non-deterministic OBDDs, as well as MDD.

Some examples of formula classes include DNF and CNF.

Examples of circuit classes include NNF, DNNF, d-DNNF, and SDD.

References 

Artificial intelligence